This is a list of the operas written by the Italian composer Antonio Salieri (1750–1825).


List

References
Notes

Sources
 Rice, John A. (1992), "Salieri, Antonio" in The New Grove Dictionary of Opera, ed. Stanley Sadie (London) 

 
Lists of operas by composer
Lists of compositions by composer